Moss Side is a historic farm property at 8501 Virginia State Route 249 in central New Kent County, Virginia. Although this type of house was once quite common, it is a well-preserved example of the style, and is accompanied by a period outbuilding that probably functioned as either a guest house, kitchen, or tenant housing. Although the property's early history is dominated by the Christian family, these buildings date to the late 19th-century ownership by Henry Meyers, who gave the property its name.

The property was listed on the National Register of Historic Places in 2017.

See also
National Register of Historic Places listings in New Kent County, Virginia

References

Houses completed in 1870
Houses in New Kent County, Virginia
Houses on the National Register of Historic Places in Virginia
National Register of Historic Places in New Kent County, Virginia
1870 establishments in Virginia